This is a list of the mammal species recorded in Monaco. There are ten mammal species in Monaco, none of which are threatened.

The following tags are used to highlight each species' conservation status as assessed by the International Union for Conservation of Nature:

Order: Rodentia (rodents) 

Rodents make up the largest order of mammals, with over 40% of mammalian species. They have two incisors in the upper and lower jaw which grow continually and must be kept short by gnawing.

Suborder: Myomorpha
Family: Muridae (mice, rats, gerbils, etc.)
Subfamily: Murinae
Genus: Apodemus
 Wood mouse, A. sylvaticus

Order: Erinaceomorpha (hedgehogs and gymnures) 

The order Erinaceomorpha contains a single family, Erinaceidae, which comprise the hedgehogs and gymnures. The hedgehogs are easily recognised by their spines while gymnures look more like large rats.
Family: Erinaceidae (hedgehogs)
Subfamily: Erinaceinae
Genus: Erinaceus
West European hedgehog, E. europaeus

Order: Soricomorpha (shrews, moles, and solenodons) 

The "shrew-forms" are insectivorous mammals. The shrews and solenodons closely resemble mice while the moles are stout-bodied burrowers.
Family: Talpidae (moles)
Subfamily: Talpinae
Tribe: Talpini
Genus: Talpa
 Mediterranean mole, Talpa caeca
 European mole, Talpa europaea

Order: Cetacea (whales) 

The order Cetacea includes whales, dolphins and porpoises. They are the mammals most fully adapted to aquatic life with a spindle-shaped nearly hairless body, protected by a thick layer of blubber, and forelimbs and tail modified to provide propulsion underwater.
Suborder: Mysticeti
Family: Balaenopteridae
Genus: Balaenoptera
 Fin whale, Balaenoptera physalus EN
Suborder: Odontoceti
Superfamily: Platanistoidea
Family: Delphinidae (marine dolphins)
Genus: Stenella
 Striped dolphin, Stenella coeruleoalba LC
Genus: Delphinus
 Short-beaked common dolphin, Delphinus delphis LC

Order: Carnivora (carnivorans) 

There are over 260 species of carnivorans, the majority of which feed primarily on meat. They have a characteristic skull shape and dentition. 
Suborder: Caniformia
Family: Canidae (dogs, foxes)
Genus: Vulpes
Red fox, V. vulpes 
Family: Mustelidae (mustelids)
Genus: Mustela
Least weasel, M. nivalis

Order: Artiodactyla (even-toed ungulates) 

The even-toed ungulates are ungulates whose weight is borne about equally by the third and fourth toes, rather than mostly or entirely by the third as in perissodactyls. There are about 220 artiodactyl species, including many that are of great economic importance to humans.

Family: Cervidae (deer)
Subfamily: Capreolinae
Genus: Capreolus
 Roe deer, C. capreolus

Locally extinct 
The following species are locally extinct in the country:
Brown bear, Ursus arctos

See also
List of chordate orders
Lists of mammals by region
List of prehistoric mammals
Mammal classification
List of mammals described in the 2000s

Notes

References
 

Monaco
Mammals
Mammals
Monaco